The Dolo is a mountain stream that rises on the slopes of Mount Cusna in the Reggio-Emilia province, of the Tuscany-Emilia Romagna Apennine Mountains. The Dolo acts as a natural boundary between the provinces of Reggio Emilia and Modena.

About  before entering the Secchia river, the Dragone mountain stream flows into the Dolo.

Rivers of Italy
Rivers of Emilia-Romagna
Rivers of the Province of Reggio Emilia
Rivers of the Province of Modena